The Bearhawk LSA is an American amateur-built light-sport aircraft, designed by Bob Barrows and produced by Bearhawk Aircraft of Austin, Texas. The aircraft is supplied in the form of plans or a kit for amateur construction.

The aircraft was introduced to the public at AirVenture 2012.

Design and development
The Bearhawk LSA is  a "clean sheet design" inspired by the larger Barrows Bearhawk. The LSA features a strut-braced high-wing, a tandem enclosed cockpit accessed by doors, fixed conventional landing gear and a single engine in tractor configuration. In 2015 a quick-build kit was introduced at the U.S Sport Aviation Expo.

The aircraft fuselage is fabricated from welded 4130 steel tubing covered in doped aircraft fabric. The aluminum structure wing, covered in flush riveted aluminum sheet, employs a new Harry Riblett-designed airfoil and does not have flaps. The wing is supported by a single strut per side.

Operational history
As of February 2016, four examples were registered in the United States with the Federal Aviation Administration.

Specifications (LSA)

References

External links

Homebuilt aircraft
Single-engined tractor aircraft
Light-sport aircraft
LSA
High-wing aircraft